Eggington is an English surname. Notable people with the surname include:

Sam Eggington (born 1993), British professional boxer
William G. Eggington (born 1950), Australian linguist

See also
Egginton (surname)

English-language surnames